was a Japanese samurai and member of the main Oda clan of Owari Province during the Sengoku and Azuchi–Momoyama periods. Nobuzumi was the son of Oda Nobuyuki, thus making the famed Oda Nobunaga his uncle.

In 1579, Tsuda Nobuzumi led a requisition unit into the inner citadel of Arioka castle, drawing to an end the Siege of Itami against Araki Murashige.

In 1581, at the second Tenshō Iga War, he and Oda Nobukatsu led 10,000 men entering Iga province from Ise (Aoyama Pass) to the southeast.

After the Incident at Honnō-ji in 1582, Nobuzumi came under the suspicion of Oda Nobutaka of collaboration with Akechi Mitsuhide, largely because of his marriage with Mitsuhide's daughter. Due to this guilt by association, Nobutaka had Nobuzumi killed.

Family
Father: Oda Nobuyuki (1536–1557)
Son: Oda Masazumi (1579–1641)
Brother: Tsuda Nobutada (1555-1631)

1555 births
1582 deaths
Oda clan